Conn N. McCreary (June 17, 1921 - June 29, 1979) was a United States Hall of Fame jockey and trainer in Thoroughbred horse racing who won four American Classic Races.

Riding career
Born in St. Louis, Missouri, Conn McCreary began his professional career in 1937 and got his first win the next year at Chicago's Arlington Park. In 1941 he earned the first of his many important wins when he rode Our Boots to victory in the Blue Grass Stakes at Keeneland Race Course over the heavily favored Whirlaway. In the ensuing Kentucky Derby and Preakness Stakes, McCreary and Our Boots finished eighth and third respectively to winner Whirlaway who went on to win the U.S. Triple Crown with a victory in the Belmont Stakes. Three years later aboard the Calumet Farm colt, Pensive, McCreary himself came within a few feet of winning the U.S. Triple Crown. After victories in the Derby and Preakness, he finished second by a half a length to William Ziegler Jr.'s colt, Bounding Home. In 1951, McCreary won his second Kentucky Derby with 14:1 outsider, Count Turf then the following year won his second Preakness Stakes with Blue Man.

A fan favorite for the drama of his come-from-behind tactics, Conn McCreary won numerous Graded stakes races at tracks across the United States including prestige events such as the San Juan Capistrano, Blue Grass Stakes, Jockey Club Gold Cup and Travers Stakes. Among the top quality horses he rode were four Hall of Fame inductees, Devil Diver, Armed,  Bric A Bac, and Stymie.

Retirement
Retired from riding in 1960, Conn McCreary took up training for a time and had his own stable, MacConn Farms, where he bought and trained horses for Florida developer Andrew Capeletti. He then worked as a publicity agent for Hialeah and Calder racetracks before becoming the manager of Golden Hawk Farm in Ocala, Florida where he was employed at the time of his death in 1979.

Honors
Conn McCreary was inducted in the National Museum of Racing and Hall of Fame in 1974.

References
 Conn McCreary at the United States' National Museum of Racing and Hall of Fame
 Conn McCreary's Kentucky Derby charts

1921 births
1979 deaths
American jockeys
American horse trainers
United States Thoroughbred Racing Hall of Fame inductees
People from Jefferson County, Missouri
Sportspeople from St. Louis